The Ratonero Valenciano, also known as the Gos Rater Valencià (English for: Valencian rat hunting dog), is a breed of dog that originates in Spain. Recognised by the Real Sociedad Canina de España in 2004, it has had recent success with a member of the breed winning the Spanish National Dog Show in 2011. It is a traditionally docked breed. In 2022, the FCI finally recognised the breed, naming it rather "Terrier" than "Ratter".

History
The breed originates from Valencia in Spain, where it has traditionally been used to catch rats and other rodents. The breed is thought to have existed since the sixteenth century. There are several theories around the breed's origin, including either that stock from British Fox Terriers may have been introduced to native dogs, or that it is simply that breeding dogs for similar purposes have led to similar results.

The breed is recognized by the Real Sociedad Canina de España, the national kennel club for Spain, since 2004. The club uses the structure set out by the Fédération Cynologique Internationale, and places the breed within Group 3:Terriers, and the subgroup, Section 1:Large and medium-sized terriers. As of 31 December 2010, there were 523 Ratonero Valencianos registered with the RSCE.

Description
The most common markings are tricolor, with the colors dominating the white portion of the coat. Other markings include black and tan, brown and white, and brown and tan. Both sexes weight ranges are the same, ideally .

The breed standard describes them as tailless dogs, and states that any tail should be cropped either "without respecting any vertebra or just the first".

Temperament
The dogs continue to be used in hunting, specifically for rabbits.

See also
 Dogs portal
 List of dog breeds
Ratonero Bodeguero Andaluz

References

External links

Spanish National Breed Club
Real Sociedad Canina de España Breed Standard

Dog breeds originating in the Valencian Community
Terriers
FCI breeds